Jiří Novák and David Rikl were the defending champions but did not compete that year.

João Cunha e Silva and Nuno Marques won in the final 7–6, 6–2 against Karim Alami and Hicham Arazi.

Seeds

Draw

External links
 1997 Grand Prix Hassan II Doubles draw

1997 ATP Tour
1997 Grand Prix Hassan II